Jocara marchiana is a species of snout moth found in Guatemala.

References

Moths described in 1922
Jocara